Ruahine Forest Park is a protected area in New Zealand's North Island, predominantly in Rangitikei District in Manawatū-Whanganui.

The park is managed by the New Zealand Department of Conservation.

Geography

History

The park was established in 1976.

References

Forest parks of New Zealand
Protected areas of Manawatū-Whanganui
Rangitikei District
1976 establishments in New Zealand
Protected areas established in 1976